Trochulus is a genus of small air-breathing land snails, terrestrial pulmonate gastropod mollusks in the subfamily subfamily Trochulininae of the family Hygromiidae, the hairy snails and their allies.

Taxonomy 
Trichia Hartmann, 1840 is a junior synonym of Trochulus Chemnitz, 1786.

Nearly every malacological work prior to 2006 used the name Trichia instead of the (now considered valid) name Trochulus.

The genus Plicuteria Schileyko, 1978 has been once recognized as a subgenus within Trochulus by Schileyko (1978). Based on molecular analyses, Trochulus lubomirski does not belong to the genus Trochulus. Trochulus lubomirski (Ślósarski, 1881) is now recognized as Plicuteria lubomirski (Ślósarski, 1881).

Species

The speciation centre for the genus Trochulus is in the Alps.

The type species of this genus is Trochulus hispidus.

Species within the genus Trochulus include:

 Trochulus alpicola (Eder, 1921)
 Trochulus ataxiacus (Fagot, 1884)
 Trochulus biconicus (Eder, 1917) - synonym: Trichia biconica
 Trochulus glyptus (Locard, 1880) - synonym: Trochulus caelatus (Studer, 1820) - synonym: Trichia caelata
 Trochulus clandestinus (Hartmann, 1821)
 Trochulus coelomphala (Locard, 1888)
 Trochulus graminicola (Falkner, 1973) - synonym: Trichia gramnicola
 Trochulus hispidus (Linnaeus, 1758) - synonyms: Trichia hispida (Linnaeus, 1758), Trochulus sericeus (Draparnaud, 1801)
 Trochulus montanus (Studer, 1820)
 Trochulus phorochaetius (Bourguignat, 1864)
 Trochulus plebeius (Draparnaud, 1805) - synonym: Trichia plebeia
 Trochulus striolatus (C. Pfeiffer, 1828) - synonym: Trichia striolata
 Trochulus suberectus (Clessin, 1878)
 Trochulus villosus (Draparnaud, 1805)
 Trochulus villosulus - (Rossmässler, 1838) - synonym: Trichia villosula (Rossmässler, 1838)
Species brought into synonymy
 Trochulus erjaveci (Brusina, 1870): synonym of Xerocampylaea erjaveci (Brusina, 1870)
 Trochulus lubomirskii (Ślósarski, 1881): synonym of Plicuteria lubomirskii (Ślósarski, 1881)
 Trochulus oreinos (Wagner, 1915): synonym of Noricella oreinos (Wagner, 1915)
 Trochulus waldemari (Wagner, 1912): synonym of Xerocampylaea waldemari (Wagner, 1912)

Hair on shells 
The periostracum of the shells of most Trochulus species has hair-like features. Some of the hair-less species do possess hairs as juveniles. Hairy shells appeared to be the ancestral character state in the genus Trochulus, a feature which has most probably been lost three times independently.

These losses were correlated with a shift from humid to dry habitats, indicating an adaptive function of hairs in moist environments. It had been previously hypothesised that these costly protein structures of the outer shell layer facilitate locomotion in moist habitats. Experiments by Pfenninger et al. (2005) showed an increased adherence of haired shells to wet surfaces. The possession of hairs facilitates the adherence of the snails to their herbaceous food plants during foraging, when humidity levels are high. The absence of hairs in some Trochulus species could thus be explained as a loss of the potential adaptive function linked to habitat shifts.

Feeding habits 
Trochulus species in moist habitats prefer to forage on large-leaved herbaceous plants like Adenostyles, Urtica (nettles), Homogyne or Tussilago (coltsfoot etc).

References
This article incorporates CC-BY-2.0 text from reference.

Further reading 
 
 Hrabáková M., Juřičková L. & Petrušek A. (2006) "Taxonomy of the genus Trochulus (Gastropoda: Hygromiidae) in the Czech Republic".
 
 

Hygromiidae
Gastropod genera
Taxonomy articles created by Polbot